Princess Elizabeth of Greece and Denmark (24 May 1904 – 11 January 1955) was the middle daughter of Prince Nicholas of Greece and Grand Duchess Elena Vladimirovna of Russia.

Early life

Princess Elizabeth was born on 24 May 1904 at the Tatoi Palace just north of Athens, Greece, during the reign of her paternal grandfather, King George I. She was the second daughter of Prince Nicholas of Greece and Denmark, and his wife Grand Duchess Elena Vladimirovna of Russia. Her father was the third son of King George I and Queen Olga of Greece, while her mother was the only daughter of Grand Duke Vladimir Alexandrovich and Grand Duchess Maria Pavlovna of Russia. Her father was a grandson of King Christian IX of Denmark, while her mother was a granddaughter of Emperor Alexander II of Russia.

Princess Elizabeth had two sisters, an older sister Princess Olga and a younger sister Princess Marina. Princess Olga married Prince Paul of Yugoslavia in 1923. After the assassination of his cousin, King Alexander I, Paul served as Prince Regent of Yugoslavia from 1934 to 1941. Princess Marina married Prince George, Duke of Kent, in 1934. One of their paternal uncles was Prince Andrew of Greece and Denmark, the father of Prince Philip, Duke of Edinburgh (making Elizabeth and her sisters Philip's first cousins).

Her family nicknamed her 'Woolly' because of her thick, dark brown hair. Princess Elizabeth was a keen horsewoman and painter.

Marriage and issue

Elizabeth married Count Carl Theodor of Törring-Jettenbach (22 September 1900 – 14 May 1967) on 10 January 1934. Through his mother, Duchess Sophie Adelheid in Bavaria, he was the nephew of Queen Elisabeth of Belgium and of Princess Marie Gabrielle of Bavaria. Elizabeth and Carl Theodor had two children:

Hans Veit Kaspar Nikolaus, Count of Törring-Jettenbach (11 January 1935), who married Princess Henriette of Hohenlohe-Bartenstein and had issue
Countess Helene Marina Elisabeth of Törring-Jettenbach (20 May 1937), who married Archduke Ferdinand Karl Max of Austria and had issue, including Archduchess Sophie of Austria, the designer Sophie Habsburg.

Elizabeth died of cancer on 11 January 1955 in Munich. She was 50 years old.

Honours
 Dame Grand Cross of the Order of Saints Olga and Sophia.

Ancestry

References

External links

1904 births
1955 deaths
House of Glücksburg (Greece)
Greek princesses
Danish princesses
Greek equestrians